Maksim Myakish (born 3 March 2000) is a Belarusian professional footballer who plays for Torpedo-BelAZ Zhodino.

Honours
BATE Borisov
Belarusian Cup winner: 2019–20, 2020–21

References

External links 
 
 

2000 births
Living people
Belarusian footballers
Association football midfielders
Belarusian expatriate footballers
Expatriate footballers in Portugal
FC Neman Grodno players
FC BATE Borisov players
FC Slavia Mozyr players
FC Isloch Minsk Raion players
FC Torpedo-BelAZ Zhodino players